Toakipa Tasefa (born 19 January 1972, Niue) is a Niuean retired professional boxer who competed from 1993 to 2001.

Tasefa Has fought in multiple countries in his career including New Zealand, USA, Australia, Japan, French Polynesia and Russia. Tasefa was managed by Mike Edwards.

Professional boxing titles
New Zealand Boxing Association
New Zealand national heavyweight title 
World Boxing Council  
Oriental and Pacific Boxing Federation heavyweight title (210Ibs)
Oceanic Boxing Association
OBA heavyweight title

Professional boxing record

References

1972 births
Living people
Niuean male boxers
Niuean emigrants to New Zealand
Heavyweight boxers
New Zealand male boxers
New Zealand professional boxing champions